Michael Egnew (born November 1, 1989) is a former American football tight end. He played college football for the University of Missouri, where he was a consensus All-American tight end.  He was drafted by the Miami Dolphins in the third round of the 2012 NFL Draft. He has been a member of the Detroit Lions.

Early years
Egnew was born in Lubbock, Texas. He attended Plainview High School, and was a standout tight end for the Plainview Bulldogs high school football team.  He was also a member of the Bulldogs basketball and track and field teams, and placed first in the state track championships in the long jump.

College career
Egnew attended the University of Missouri, where he played for coach Gary Pinkel's Missouri Tigers football team from 2008 to 2011.  He was a finalist for the John Mackey Award in 2010. Following his junior season in 2010, Egnew was named a first-team All-Big 12 selection and was recognized as a consensus first-team All-American. As a senior in 2011, he was named a first-team All-Big 12 selection for the second consecutive year.

Professional career

Regarded as one of the best tight ends in the 2012 NFL Draft, Egnew was selected in the third round (78th pick overall) by the Miami Dolphins.  He was the third tight end chosen in the 2012 draft.

On July 26, 2012, Egnew signed a four-year contract with the Miami Dolphins. On August 22, 2014, Egnew was released.

On August 25, 2014, Egnew was picked up off waivers by the Detroit Lions. He was waived on August 30, 2014.

On September 9, 2014, he was signed to the Jacksonville Jaguars practice squad. He was released from the practice squad on September 24.

Personal life

Michael Egnew was chosen to be the head coach for Father Tolton Regional Catholic High School in Columbia Missouri starting in the 2019-2020 season. He was previously an assistant coach at the same school for four seasons.

References

External links
 
 Missouri Tigers bio
 https://www.columbiamissourian.com/sports/prep_sports/tolton-chooses-michael-egnew-as-next-football-coach/article_d963a1ca-5a02-11e9-af2f-3ba50f70415e.html

1989 births
Living people
Plainview High School (Texas) alumni
Sportspeople from Lubbock, Texas
Players of American football from Texas
All-American college football players
American football tight ends
Missouri Tigers football players
Miami Dolphins players
Detroit Lions players
Jacksonville Jaguars players
Pittsburgh Steelers players
New Orleans Saints players